Shumilikha is a rural locality (a selo) and the administrative center of Shumilikhinsky Selsoviet, Rebrikhinsky District, Altai Krai, Russia. The population was 540 as of 2013. There are 3 streets.

Geography 
Shumilikha is located 28 km west of Rebrikha (the district's administrative centre) by road. Tulay is the nearest rural locality.

References 

Rural localities in Rebrikhinsky District